The 2014 Famous Idaho Potato Bowl was a college football bowl game that was played on December 20, 2014 at Albertsons Stadium on the campus of Boise State University in Boise, Idaho. It was one of the 2014–15 bowl games that concluded the 2014 FBS football season. The eighteenth annual Famous Idaho Potato Bowl, it pitted the Western Michigan Broncos of the Mid-American Conference against the Air Force Falcons of the Mountain West Conference. The game started at 3:45 p.m. MST and aired on ESPN.  The game was sponsored by the Idaho Potato Commission.  Air Force beat Western Michigan by a score of 38–24.

Teams
The game featured the Western Michigan Broncos of the Mid-American Conference against the Air Force Falcons of the Mountain West Conference, and was the first Famous Idaho Potato Bowl for both teams.

This was the first overall meeting between these two teams.

Western Michigan Broncos

After finishing their regular season with an 8–4 record, the Broncos accepted their invitation to play in the game.

In addition to this being Western Michigan's first Famous Idaho Potato Bowl, it was also their first bowl game since the 2011 Little Caesars Pizza Bowl.  The Broncos were seeking their first-ever bowl victory, as they were 0–5 in their prior bowl games.

Air Force Falcons

After finishing their regular season with a 9–3 record, the Falcons accepted their invitation to play in the game.

Game summary

Scoring summary

Source:

Statistics

References

Famous Idaho Potato Bowl
Famous Idaho Potato Bowl
Air Force Falcons football bowl games
Western Michigan Broncos football bowl games
Famous Idaho Potato Bowl
December 2014 sports events in the United States